Abdon Sgarbi (29 March 1903 – 18 August 1929) was an Italian professional footballer who played as a midfielder. He died of pulmonary disease, aged only 26.

External links 
Profile at MagliaRossonera.it 
International caps at FIGC.it 

1903 births
1929 deaths
Italian footballers
Association football midfielders
Italy international footballers
S.P.A.L. players
A.C. Milan players